Patrick Vernay is a New Caledonian triathlete.

He is a multiple-time winner of Ironman Australia and a nine-time winner of Ironman triathlons.

He finished 10th at the 2006 Ironman World Championship and 2007 Ironman World Championship.

References 

Living people
New Caledonian male triathletes
New Caledonian male athletes
Year of birth missing (living people)